Guy Newall (25 May 1885 – 25 February 1937) was a British actor, screenwriter and film director. He was born on the Isle of Wight on 25 May 1885. He began his film career by acting in the 1915 film The Heart of Sister Ann. In 1920 he directed his first film, and went on to direct a further ten including The Chinese Puzzle before his death in 1937. He established a production company with George Clark whom he had met during the First World War, and they raised finance to construct a new studios at Beaconsfield Studios. Newall was married twice, to actresses Ivy Duke and Dorothy Batley.

Partial filmography
Director
 The Bigamist (1921)
 Fox Farm (1922)
 Boy Woodburn (1922)
 A Maid of the Silver Sea (1922)
 The Starlit Garden (1923)
 What the Butler Saw (1924)
 Rodney Steps In (1931)
 The Rosary (1931)
 The Marriage Bond (1932)
 The Chinese Puzzle (1932)
 Chin Chin Chinaman (1932)
 The Admiral's Secret (1934)

Actor
 The Heart of Sister Ann (1915)
 Esther (1916)
 Driven (1916)
 Money for Nothing (1916)
 Mother Love (1916)
 Trouble for Nothing (1916)
 The Manxman (1916)
 Comradeship (1919)
 The Garden of Resurrection (1919)
 I Will (1919)
 Fancy Dress (1919)
 The Lure of Crooning Water (1920)
 Duke's Son (1920)
 The Bigamist (1921)
 Boy Woodburn (1922)
 A Maid of the Silver Sea (1922)
 The Starlit Garden (1923)
 Ghost Train (1927)
 Number 17 (1928)
 The Road to Fortune (1930)
 The Eternal Feminine (1931)
 Potiphar's Wife (1931)
 The Marriage Bond (1932)
 Grand Finale (1936)
 Merry Comes to Town (1937)

References

External links

1885 births
1937 deaths
English male film actors
English male silent film actors
English film directors
Actors from the Isle of Wight
20th-century English male actors